Slobodishche may refer to:

Slobodishche, Bryansk Oblast, a village (selo) in Bryansk Oblast, Russia
Slobodishche, Moscow Oblast, a village in Moscow Oblast, Russia
Slobodishche, Tver Oblast, a village in Tver Oblast, Russia